Quintrell is an English surname originally from Cornwall, where it appeared after the Norman conquest of 1066 as the anglicisation of either the old french name Cointerel or – less likely – a toponymic surname derived from the French place name Chantarel. Notable people with this name include:
Mary Corinne Quintrell (1839–1918), English-born American educator and clubwoman
Robert Quintrell (1931–1983), Canadian cricketer
Sarah Quintrell, English writer and actress

See also
Quintrell Downs, village in Cornwall, England, United Kingdom

References

English-language surnames
Surnames of French origin